Ryan Broussard (born September 14, 1989) is an American actor and former Minor League Baseball player. He is known for playing Will Putnam on Only Murders in the Building and Mike Sherman in the police procedural crime series Alert: Missing Persons Unit.

Early life and education 
Broussard was born on September 14, 1989 in Breaux Bridge, Louisiana. He attended Louisiana State University at Eunice, where he played college baseball. In 2010, he was drafted by the Los Angeles Angels. He played with the team for two years as a shortstop before returning to Louisiana to study theatre at the University of Louisiana at Lafayette. Broussard received an MFA in acting from Brown University in 2019. As of 2022, he lives in Brooklyn.

Filmography

References 

21st-century American actors
1989 births

Living people
People from Breaux Bridge, Louisiana
University of Louisiana at Lafayette alumni
Brown University alumni